Eulepa (Εύλεπα) was an ancient Greek town in Cappadocia, inhabited in Hellenistic, Roman and Byzantine times. 

Its site is located near Gölova, Asiatic Turkey.

References

Populated places in ancient Cappadocia
Former populated places in Turkey
Roman towns and cities in Turkey
Populated places of the Byzantine Empire
History of Sivas Province